New Century International Hospital for Children, NCICH is a private, joint-venture, institution affiliated with the Beijing Children's Hospital at Beijing, next to the east gate of the Beijing Children's Hospital. The International Children's Hospital features services specifically designed for children and youth. In addition to full daily clinics in all of the major specialty areas, there are also focused programs in pediatric eye care and pediatric dentistry. This hospital has around 104 beds, including 95 beds for children and 9 beds for newborns. It has over 8,500 square meters building area, 24/7 emergency service, covered by many international and national insurance companies.

Overview
The International Children's Hospital is a private, joint-venture, institution affiliated with the Beijing Children's Hospital.

The inpatient floors feature 80 private rooms with sleeping accommodations for a parent to stay overnight with the child. In addition, there are 20 "expansive deluxe suites" with extended seating and other features.

Programs and services
The International Children's Hospital features services specifically designed for children. In addition to full daily clinics in all of the major specialty areas, there are also focused programs in pediatric eye care and pediatric dentistry.

The health management department offers developmental assessment, annual health examinations and routine immunizations while the specially trained pediatric nutritionist can advise parents on diet and nutritional issues.

The 24-hour-a-day, 7-days a week, pediatric emergency room is staffed by Beijing's pediatric emergency specialists. This facility includes examination rooms, overnight observation beds and access to the hospital's emergency capabilities in surgery and medicine.

Scope of services
Pediatrics Departments:
 Ear, Nose and Throat
 Ophthalmology
 Stomatology
 Dermatology
 Rheumatoid/Immunology
 Gynecology
 Infectious Disease
 Respiratory Medicine
 Allergic Disease
 Nephrology
 Digestive System Department
 Cardiology
 Neurology
 Hematological Department
 Nepiology
 Traditional Chinese medicine
 Endocrinology Department
 General Surgery
 Orthopedic Surgery
 Urology
 Neurosurgery
 Thoracic Surgery
 Surgical Oncology
 Neonatal Surgery
 Pediatric Early Stage Intelligence Growth Clinic
 Health Center
 Outpatient Department
 Plastic Surgery
 Psychological Clinic

Specialties:   
 7-day * 24-hour Accident and Emergency
 Family Doctor
 Physical Examination of Children
 Oral Health Care Annual Membership Card
 General Anesthesia Lower Tooth Treatment
 Strabismus surgery
 Optometry Center
 Discounted Surgery Package
 Adolescent Girls Perineum Disease
 Electrophysiology Tests
 Children Safe Medication Gene Test
 Respiration Tract Nursing Service
 Winter Disease Cured in Summer-Stick to Acupuncture Points in Hot Summer Days
 Children's Eyeglasses
 Summer Medication for Children
 Children's Health Management
 Anodynia Capistration Treatment
 Emergency Observation Wards
 24-hour EEG

References

External links
 Official website

Hospital buildings completed in 2005
Hospitals in Beijing
Children's hospitals in China